Carl Albert "Flisa" Andersen (15 August 1876 in Østre Aker – 28 September 1951 in Oslo) was a Norwegian pole vaulter, high jumper, and gymnast who competed in the 1900 Summer Olympics, 1906 Intercalated Games and the 1908 Summer Olympics.

As an athlete Andersen represented the IF Ørnulf club and set many Norwegian national records as well as being national champion in the pole vault and high jump in 1896, 1897 and 1900.

Andersen participated in Athletics at the 1900 Summer Olympics in Paris and competed in two field events, and won the bronze medal in the pole vault, he jumped 3.20 metres and finished behind two Americans Irving Baxter and Meredith Colket, earlier in the day he had competed in the high jump and jumped 1.70 metres to finish tied for fourth place just 5 centimetres behind another bronze medal.

At the 1906 Intercalated Games in Athens, he was a member of the Norwegian gymnastics team, which consisted of 20 gymnasts, and went on to win the gold medal in the team, Swedish system event ahead of Denmark, he also competed in the individual all round five events competition and finished in 23rd position.

Andersen also competed at the 1908 Summer Olympics in London, again he was part of the Norwegian gymnastics team that participated in the All round team event, and this time they finished in second place behind the Swedish team.

Andersen died in his hometown of Oslo in 1951 aged 75.

References

External links

1876 births
1951 deaths
Norwegian male pole vaulters
Norwegian male high jumpers
Norwegian male artistic gymnasts
Athletes (track and field) at the 1900 Summer Olympics
Gymnasts at the 1906 Intercalated Games
Gymnasts at the 1908 Summer Olympics
Olympic athletes of Norway
Olympic gymnasts of Norway
Olympic gold medalists for Norway
Olympic silver medalists for Norway
Olympic bronze medalists for Norway
Sportspeople from Oslo
Olympic medalists in gymnastics
Medalists at the 1908 Summer Olympics
Medalists at the 1900 Summer Olympics
Medalists at the 1906 Intercalated Games
Olympic bronze medalists in athletics (track and field)
Olympic male high jumpers
Athletes from Oslo
20th-century Norwegian people